Matti Antero Karjalainen (April 2, 1946 – May 30, 2010) studied electronics at the Tampere University of Technology and received a doctoral degree on speech synthesis in 1978. He created Synte 2, the first portable text-to-speech synthesizer powered by a microprocessor.

He was the head of Acoustics Laboratory at the Helsinki University of Technology from 1980 to 2006. He is speech synthesis, speech analysis, speech technology, audio signal processing and psychoacoustics pioneer in Finland. He became an associate professor 1980 and a full professor 1986. He was the supervisor of 24 doctoral theses and over 100 master's theses. His laboratory is now part of the Department of Signal Processing and Acoustics of the Aalto University.

Awards and honors 
 Audio Engineering Society Fellow (1999), for significant contribution to the areas of audio signal processing and education in audio
 Audio Engineering Society Silver Medal (2006), in recognition of outstanding scientific contributions to the audio industry in acoustics, auralization, and digital signal processing and synthesis
 IEEE Fellow (2009)

Education 
Karjalainen studied at the Tampere University of Technology, where he obtained a M.Sc. (Dipl.Eng.) in 1970, a Lic.Tech. in 1974, and a Dr.Tech. (with honors) in 1978.

Thesis publications 
 Master's thesis  (Electronic thermal energy meter)
 Licentiate thesis  (A Study on Multi-Band Audio Frequency Equalizers)
 PhD thesis

Publications

Books

Personal web pages

Gallery

References

External links 

 
 
 

People from Hankasalmi
Finnish inventors
Academic staff of the Helsinki University of Technology
Fellow Members of the IEEE
Speech processing researchers
1946 births
2010 deaths